Kawamura Station (川村駅, Kawamura eki) is a railway station in Sagara Town, Kuma District, Kumamoto Prefecture, Japan. It is on the Kumagawa Railroad Yunomae Line. The station opened on 15 July 1953.

History
The station opened on 15 July 1953 under Japanese National Railways. It was then transferred to JR Kyushu on 1 April 1987 following the privatization of JNR. It was then finally transferred to the Kumagawa Railway on 1 October 1989.

Lines/Layout
The station is served by the Kumagawa Railroad Yunomae Line. The station has 1 track serving both directions with 1 side platform.

Adjacent Stations

See Also
 List of railway stations in Japan

References
This article incorporates data from the Japanese article.

Railway stations in Kumamoto Prefecture
Railway stations in Japan opened in 1937